Dodoth Morning is a 1976 film by ethnographic filmmaker Tim Asch.

A documentary film that follows a morning in the life of a family of the Dodoth people in northeast Uganda in 1961. This film features a time when too much rain threatened to rot the millet that is grown to supplement their diet, and the events that follow. It was completed in 1963.

The film is distributed by Documentary Educational Resources.

References

  

Cultural anthropology
Films directed by Timothy Asch
Anthropology documentary films
1970s English-language films